Institut Teknologi Telkom Purwokerto also known as Telkom Institute of Technology Purwokerto is a private university located in Purwokerto, Central Java，Indonesia. This institute was formerly known as Akademi Telekomunikasi Sandhy Putra Telkom which started in 2002. IT Telkom Purwokerto is financed and operated by the Telkom Foundation.

IT Telkom Purwokerto is the first institute that focuses on science, technology and engineering in Purwokerto, Central Java. 

It partners with  various universities in Korea, Cambodia, China, etc. IT Telkom Purwokerto has 13 study programs.

Facilities 
 WIFI
 Library
 Journal
 Computer Application Laboratory
 Computer Networking Laboratory
 Electrical Laboratory
 Switching Laboratory
 Sport Field Test

References

External links
 

Universities in Central Java
Universities in Indonesia
Banyumas Regency
2002 establishments in Indonesia